Chalfant (also Chalfant Valley) is an unincorporated community and census-designated place (CDP) in Mono County, California, United States. The population was 660 at the 2020 census.

Most residents commute to Bishop for work and school.

The Chalfant post office operated from 1913 to 1928. The ZIP Code is 93514. The community is inside area codes 442 and 760.

The town is named after W.A. Chalfant who moved to the area in 1885 with his family, where they started The Inyo Register newspaper. Chalfant was the editor for 55 years.

A 6.2 earthquake occurred on July 21, 1986, in the Bishop and Chalfant area, and injured two people, causing damages estimated at $2.7 million. There was a foreshock before the initial quake, and an aftershock occurred ten days after the initial temblor. Smaller aftershocks occurred through September 30, 1986.

Geography
Chalfant is in southeastern Mono County, lying in the Chalfant Valley at the western base of the White Mountains. The valley drains south to the Owens Valley in Inyo County.

Demographics

The 2010 United States Census reported that Chalfant had a population of 651. The population density was 23.2 people per square mile (9.0/km). The racial makeup of Chalfant was 594 (91.2%) White, 0 (0.0%) African American, 13 (2.0%) Native American, 5 (0.8%) Asian, 0 (0.0%) Pacific Islander, 16 (2.5%) from other races, and 23 (3.5%) from two or more races.  Hispanic or Latino of any race were 67 persons (10.3%).

The Census reported that 651 people (100% of the population) lived in households, 0 (0%) lived in non-institutionalized group quarters, and 0 (0%) were institutionalized.

There were 264 households, out of which 68 (25.8%) had children under the age of 18 living in them, 169 (64.0%) were opposite-sex married couples living together, 14 (5.3%) had a female householder with no husband present, 8 (3.0%) had a male householder with no wife present.  There were 21 (8.0%) unmarried opposite-sex partnerships, and 3 (1.1%) same-sex married couples or partnerships. 53 households (20.1%) were made up of individuals, and 25 (9.5%) had someone living alone who was 65 years of age or older. The average household size was 2.47.  There were 191 families (72.3% of all households); the average family size was 2.87.

The population was spread out, with 131 people (20.1%) under the age of 18, 46 people (7.1%) aged 18 to 24, 131 people (20.1%) aged 25 to 44, 238 people (36.6%) aged 45 to 64, and 105 people (16.1%) who were 65 years of age or older.  The median age was 47.1 years. For every 100 females, there were 100.3 males.  For every 100 females age 18 and over, there were 99.2 males.

There were 301 housing units at an average density of 10.7 per square mile (4.1/km), of which 231 (87.5%) were owner-occupied, and 33 (12.5%) were occupied by renters. The homeowner vacancy rate was 2.5%; the rental vacancy rate was 8.3%.  575 people (88.3% of the population) lived in owner-occupied housing units and 76 people (11.7%) lived in rental housing units.

Government

References

Census-designated places in Mono County, California
Owens Valley
Census-designated places in California